Hāṛh is the fourth month of the Nanakshahi calendar. This month coincides with Ashadha in the Hindu calendar and the Indian national calendar, and June and July of the Gregorian and Julian calendars and is 31 days in length.

During this month, the fifth Sikh Guru, Guru Arjan Dev was martyred by the Mughals.

Important events during this month

June
June 15 (1 Harh) - The start of the month Harh
June 16 (2 Harh) - Shaheedi (Martyrdom) of Guru Arjan Dev Ji

July
July 2 (18 Harh) - Formation of Sri Akal Takht 
July 5 (21 Harh) - Birth of Guru Har Gobind Ji / 21 Harh
July 16 (1 Sawan) - The end of the month Harh and the start of Sawan

See also
Punjabi calendar

External links
www.srigranth.org SGGS Page 133
www.sikhcoalition.org

Months of the Nanakshahi calendar
Sikh terminology